The road network of Bangladesh consists of national highways (designated by a number preceded by "N"), regional highways (R numbers) and zilla or district roads (Z numbers) which are maintained by Roads and Highways Department, as well as Upazila Roads, Union Roads, and Village Roads which are maintained by Local Government Engineering Department. The total length is more than 375,000 km.

Expressways

 Dhaka-Mawa-Bhanga Expressway

Under construction
 Dhaka Elevated Expressway 46 km
 Chittagong Elevated Expressway 16 km
 Dhaka Bypass Expressway 48 km
 Purbachal Expressway 13 km
 Dhaka—Tangail—Elenga—Rangpur Expressway 190 km
 Dhaka–Ashulia Elevated Expressway 24 km
 Gabtoli–Nabinagar–Paturia Expressway 73 km

Approved
 Dhaka Mymensingh Expressway
 Marine Drive Expressway
 Dhaka East West Elevated Expressway
 Rampura-Amulia-Demra Expressway
 Abdullahpur–Gabtoli Expressway

Proposed/Planned
 Chittagong–Cox's Bazar Expressway
 Tamabil–Gundum Expressway
 Gobrakura–Payra port Expressway
 Kotalipara–Mongla Port Expressway
 Burimari–Bhomra Expressway
 Banglabandha–Jaldhaka Expressway
 Joypurhat–Tamabil Expressway
 Sonamashjid–Brahmanbaria Expressway
 Benapol–Laksham Expressway
 Khulna City Outer Bypass Expressway
 Khulna–Mongla Expressway

Roads and highways

List of regional roads

List of zilla (district) roads

Major bridges in Bangladesh

See also
 List of roads in Nepal
 National Highways of Pakistan
 List of National Highways in India by highway number
 Transport in Bhutan

External links

 Official website

References

Roads in Bangladesh
Bangladesh
Lists of buildings and structures in Bangladesh
Bangladesh transport-related lists